Ilyas Malayev (January 12, 1936 – May 2, 2008) was an Uzbekistani musician and poet.

Malayev was born in Mary (then in the Turkmen Soviet Socialist Republic, now in Turkmenistan) to Efraim and Yelizaveta Malayev, a Bukharian Jewish family and raised in the Uzbek town of Katta-Kurgan near Bukhara. He learned to play the tar and the tanbur (both lute-like instruments), as well as the violin, and immersed himself in the shashmaqam genre. In 1951, he moved to Tashkent, where he performed with various state-sponsored ensembles, and became popular as a variety entertainer, performing comedy routines, his own songs and poetry and Shashmaqom excerpts. Tens of thousands of fans attended his stadium performances. He was later named "Honored Artist of the Uzbek SSR".

In 1994, following the breakup of the Soviet Union, Malayev emigrated to the United States where he settled in Queens, New York City along with thousands of other Bukharian Jews. Although it was a considerable step down from his fame and popularity in Uzbekistan, Malayev emigrated as he was unable to have his poetry published in his homeland, a restriction he suspected was due to either anti-Semitism or the state of the Soviet cultural bureaucracy. He was granted U.S. citizenship on November 15, 2001.

Malayev died on May 2, 2008, aged 72, after suffering from pancreatic cancer.

On May 29, 2011, in Queens, NY, USA, an honorary concert celebrating Ilyas' 75th year in his memory was held where various Bukharian Jewish and Uzbek performers gave tribute to the virtuoso.

References

External links
Ilyas Malayev - Official Web Site

1936 births
2008 deaths
American people of Uzbekistani-Jewish descent
Jewish American musicians
People from Mary, Turkmenistan
Turkmenistan Jews
Bukharan Jews
Uzbekistani musicians
20th-century Uzbekistani poets
Uzbekistani Jews
Soviet Jews
Deaths from pancreatic cancer
Deaths from cancer in New York (state)
Uzbekistani emigrants to the United States
20th-century poets
Uzbekistani male poets
20th-century male writers
20th-century American Jews
21st-century American Jews